Lady Helen Marina Lucy Taylor (née Windsor; born 28 April 1964) is a relative of the British royal family. She is the daughter of Prince Edward, Duke of Kent, and Katharine, Duchess of Kent, and a great-granddaughter of George V. She is currently 46th in the line of succession to the British throne.

Early life and youth
Born at Coppins, a country house in Iver, Buckinghamshire, Lady Helen is the only daughter of the Duke and Duchess of Kent. She was educated at Eton End School in Datchet, then at St Mary's School, Wantage, and Gordonstoun. At Gordonstoun, she was one of 20 sixth form girls "in the robustly masculine environment of Gordonstoun," wrote Alan Hamilton.

She was called "Melons" in the popular press.

"I was slightly chubby, it was the boys at Gordonstoun who called me that. I think there are only about two people who call me that now. The original context has long gone" 

During the 1980s her boyfriend was Nigel Oakes, who "appalled the Queen" after she smuggled him into her parents' grace-and-favour home, York House, St James's Palace.

According to drummer Lol Tolhurst, Lady Helen was a "mad Cure fan" who visited the band backstage in the early 80s.

Career
After she left Gordonstoun (where she had art class), she was desperate to come to London and earn money, starting in 1984 at Christie's auction house in their Contemporary Department.

Lady Helen worked with the art dealer Karsten Schubert between 1987 and 1991, behind the front desk, and was later credited with discovering Rachel Whiteread and Gary Hume, but confessed in a television interview that she had turned down representing artist Damien Hirst.

For 17 years, Lady Helen was a fashion ambassador and muse to Giorgio Armani.

Marriage and children
At 19, Lady Helen met Timothy Verner Taylor (b. 8 August 1963), an art dealer and the eldest son of Commander Michael Verner Taylor, RN and Susan Geraldine Percy. They married nine years later, on 18 July 1992, at St. George's Chapel, Windsor Castle. The bride wore a Catherine Walker design. Giorgio Armani provided an outfit for her wedding.

In 1998, her husband was diagnosed with Hodgkin's disease.

Lady Helen and her husband have four children, who immediately follow her in the Line of succession to the British throne:
 Columbus George Donald Taylor (born 6 August 1994)
 Cassius Edward Taylor (born 26 December 1996) who studied Arts Management at Goldsmiths
 Eloise Olivia Katherine Taylor (born 2 March 2003)
 Estella Olga Elizabeth Taylor (born 21 December 2004)

Charity work
She is a patron of the CLIC Sargent children's cancer charity.

She is a trustee of The Royal Marsden Cancer Charity.

She is on the Advisory Board of the Glyndebourne Festival Opera after being a trustee.

References

1964 births
Living people
British people of Austrian descent
British people of Danish descent
British people of German descent
British people of Greek descent
British people of Russian descent
Daughters of British dukes
Helen Taylor
People educated at Gordonstoun
People educated at Heathfield School, Ascot
People educated at St Mary’s School, Wantage